Davison High School is a girls' Church of England secondary school serving pupils aged 11 to 16 in Worthing, West Sussex, England. In its last inspection the school was judged by OFSTED as Good. The school accommodates around 1080 girls across five year groups.

The original Davison School was a boys' school, opened on Chapel Road in 1812 and named after the Reverend William Davison, the first chaplain of St Paul's Church, Worthing.  The school moved to its current site off Selborne Road in 1960.  The culverted Teville Stream flows under the school's playing fields.

The school is the home of the Davison Worthing Youth Concert Band which gives opportunities to any age or ability to join.

Notable former pupils
 Prof Emma Bunce, Professor of Planetary Plasma Physics at the University of Leicester, won the Chapman Medal in 2018

References

External links

Davison High School Website

Buildings and structures in Worthing
Church of England secondary schools in the Diocese of Chichester
Girls' schools in West Sussex
Secondary schools in West Sussex
Voluntary controlled schools in England